The 1944 United States presidential election in South Dakota took place on November 7, 1944, as part of the 1944 United States presidential election. Voters chose four representatives, or electors, to the Electoral College, who voted for president and vice president.

South Dakota was won by Governor Thomas E. Dewey (R–New York), running with Governor John Bricker, with 58.33% of the popular vote, against incumbent President Franklin D. Roosevelt (D–New York), running with Senator Harry S. Truman, with 41.67% of the popular vote.

With 58.33% of the popular vote, South Dakota would prove to be Dewey's third strongest state after Kansas and Nebraska.

Results

Results by county

See also
 United States presidential elections in South Dakota

References

South Dakota
1944
1944 South Dakota elections